Newton McFaul MacTavish (February 19, 1875August 17, 1941) was a Canadian journalist and art critic.

Early life and education 
Newton McFaul MacTavish was born on February 19, 1875, in Staffa, Ontario, a community in West Perth, Ontario.

He was educated by private tutors and at McGill University.

Career 
MacTavish joined the staff of The Globe in 1899 and became its Montreal correspondent in 1903.

Beginning in 1906, he was the editor of the Canadian Magazine.

On June 27, 1926, MacTavish was named a member of Canada's federal civil service commission, now the Public Service Commission of Canada. Before his appointment, he had been a trustee of the National Gallery of Canada and Acadia University.

MacTavish died on August 17, 1941, in Toronto.

Publications

Books

Articles

References 

1875 births
1941 deaths
19th-century Canadian journalists
20th-century Canadian journalists
Canadian art critics
The Globe and Mail columnists
McGill University alumni
Writers from Ontario